Crème de cassis (also known as Cassis liqueur) is a sweet, dark red liqueur made from blackcurrants.

Several cocktails are made with crème de cassis, including the popular wine cocktail, kir.

It may also be served as an after-dinner liqueur or as a frappé.

Ingredients
It is made from blackcurrants that are crushed and soaked in alcohol, with sugar subsequently added.

Origin and production
The modern version of the beverage first appeared in 1841, when it displaced "ratafia de cassis", which had been produced in prior centuries.

While crème de cassis is a specialty of Burgundy, it is also made in Anjou, England, Luxembourg, Alberta, Quebec, Vermont and Tasmania.

The quality of crème de cassis depends upon the variety of fruit used, the content of the berries, and the production process. If it is labelled "Crème de Cassis de Dijon", one is guaranteed berries from the commune of Dijon.

In 1979, Germany attempted to restrict the import based on the alcohol content being too low. The Europe Court of Justice found this to be a breach of trade, in Rewe-Zentral AG v Bundesmonopolverwaltung für Branntwein.

In 2015, the new protected geographical indication (PGI) "Crème de Cassis de Bourgogne" was approved. Promoted by a syndicate of fruit producers and liqueurs companies from Burgundy, this "Crème de Cassis de Bourgogne" guarantees the Burgundian origin and the minimum quantity of berries used in its production, essentially the variety Noir de Bourgogne.

Sales
Nearly  of crème de cassis are produced annually in France. It is consumed mostly in France but is also exported.

In popular culture
It is a favourite drink of the fictional detective Hercule Poirot.

References

French liqueurs
Berry liqueurs